Salt Creek is a stream in the U.S. state of California.

Salt Creek was named for the brine springs which empty into its headwaters.

References

Rivers of California
Rivers of Tehama County, California